Samuel Lillo (1870–1958) was a Chilean writer. He won the Chilean National Prize for Literature in 1947.

References

External links
 
 

1870 births
1958 deaths
Chilean male writers
National Prize for Literature (Chile) winners
People from Lota, Chile